Nemapogon gliriella is a moth of the family Tineidae. It is found in Germany, Austria, the Czech Republic, Slovakia, Russia and Georgia.

The wingspan is 12–17 mm.

The larvae feed on fungus species, including Stereum hirsutum.

References

Moths described in 1865
Nemapogoninae